Yaya Han is a Chinese–American cosplayer, model and costume designer based in the United States. She is a regular judge at cosplay competitions. Han was featured on the Syfy channel's Heroes of Cosplay, and has appeared as a guest judge on the TBS reality show King of the Nerds multiple times.

Gallery

Bibliography

Filmography

References

External links

Chinese female models
Chinese expatriates in the United States
Cosplayers
Living people
1980 births